Gabon competed at the 2016 Summer Olympics in Rio de Janeiro, Brazil, from 5 to 21 August 2016. This was the nation's tenth appearance at the Olympics.

Gabon Olympic Committee sent a total of six athletes, four men and two women, to compete in four different sports at these Games. The nation's roster was relatively smaller by nearly three quarters of its size from London 2012, where Gabon registered a team of 26 athletes. Among the sports represented by the athletes, Gabon made its Olympic debut in swimming.

Among the Gabonese athletes on the team were sprinters Wilfried Bingangoye and Ruddy Zang Milama, and taekwondo fighter Anthony Obame, who established history as the nation's first ever Olympic medalist, earning the silver in the men's heavyweight category (+80 kg) four years earlier. The most successful athlete of the Games, Obame led the team as Gabon's first male flag bearer in the opening ceremony since 1996.

Gabon, however, left Rio de Janeiro without a single Olympic medal, failing to reproduce it from the previous Games.

Athletics (track and field)
 
Gabonese athletes have so far achieved qualifying standards in the following athletics events (up to a maximum of 3 athletes in each event):

Track & road events

Judo
 
Gabon has qualified two judokas for each of the following weight classes at the Games. Sarah Myriam Mazouz was ranked among the top 14 eligible judokas for women in the IJF World Ranking List of May 30, 2016, while Paul Kibikai at men's half-middleweight (81 kg) earned a continental quota spot from the African region as Gabon's top-ranked judoka outside of direct qualifying position.

Swimming

Gabon has received a Universality invitation from FINA to send a male swimmer for the first time to the Olympics.

Taekwondo
 
Gabon entered one athlete into the taekwondo competition at the Olympics. 2012 Olympic silver medalist Anthony Obame qualified automatically for the men's heavyweight category (+80 kg) by finishing in the top 6 WTF Olympic rankings.

References

External links
 
 

Nations at the 2016 Summer Olympics
2016
Olympics